Diamond Star may refer to:

 Diamond-Star Motors (DSM), an automobile-manufacturing joint-venture
 Diamond DA40 (Diamond Star), an aircraft
 Diamond DA42 (Diamond Twin Star), an aircraft
 Diamond DA50 (Diamond Super Star), an aircraft
 Diamond Star, Arizona, original name of Star Valley, a town in Gila County, Arizona, United States
 BPM 37093 (V886 Centauri), a variable white dwarf star with a core of crystallized carbon
 Title of a CD by Point Valid
 Maricel Soriano, Filipino actress known as "The Diamond Star"

See also 
 Earth Star Diamond